Bagio Gavinelli (30 January 1898 – 7 January 1981) was an Italian racing cyclist. He rode in the 1928 Tour de France.

References

1898 births
1981 deaths
Italian male cyclists
Place of birth missing